The 1987 mayoral election was held to elect the 39th mayor of San Francisco. Dianne Feinstein, then the incumbent, had served as mayor since the 1978 assassination of mayor George Moscone and supervisor Harvey Milk and had been elected to full terms in 1979 and 1983, and was thus term-limited. Then-California State Assembly member Art Agnos came from behind to defeat Supervisor John Molinari, garnering nearly 70 percent of the vote.

Results

First round

Runoff

References

San Francisco mayoral election
Mayoral elections in San Francisco
San Francisco
Mayoral election
San Francisco mayoral election